Tetraplariidae is a family of bryozoans belonging to the order Cheilostomatida.

Genera:
 Tetraplaria Tenison-Woods, 1879
 Tychinella Zágoršek, 2001

References

Cheilostomatida